Al-Kut Sport Club, is an Iraqi football club based in Wasit, that plays in Iraq Division Two.

History

1991–2006 : Ups and downs
The 1991–92 season, the club was playing in Iraqi Premier League for first time, They kept trying to compete with teams in the league for three seasons and they was mediating the teams in the league standings or close to relegation sometimes. In the fourth season, they were relegated to Iraq Division One at the end. But gained promotion one years later, they played in league in two seasons (1996–97, 1997–98, and were relegated to Division One again, but gained promotion one years later. The club returned to play in the premier League for two more seasons (1999–2000, 2000–01), then relegated to Division One for three consecutive years, and then returned to the premier League to play two season (2004–05), (2005–06) and then relegated at the end.

Current squad

First-team squad

Current technical staff

{| class="toccolours"
!bgcolor=silver|Position
!bgcolor=silver|Name
!bgcolor=silver|Nationality
|- bgcolor=#eeeeee
|Manager:||Majed Kadhim Al-Badri||
|- 
|Assistant manager:||Muhanad Mahdi||
|- bgcolor=#eeeeee
| Goalkeeping coach:||Haider Nafil||
|-
| Fitness coach:||Thaer Zwaid||
|-bgcolor=#eeeeee
|Team supervisor:||Ali Aifan||
|-

References

External links
 Iraq Clubs- Foundation Dates

1956 establishments in Iraq
Association football clubs established in 1956
Football clubs in Wasit